Gerard Collins (born 12 March 1955) is a Scottish former football player and coach who managed Falkirk and Partick Thistle for short spells. Collins was assistant manager to John Lambie at both clubs before being promoted to manager.

Playing career
Collins turned out for Stranraer, Albion Rovers, Ayr United, Hamilton Academical and Partick Thistle during an eleven playing career year.

Coaching career

Hamilton Academical
Collins and Lambie first teamed up in 1985 when the former was a player with Hamilton and the pair have been together ever since. Success quickly followed as Lambie and Collins led the Accies to the First Division title in 1985–86 and a shock Scottish Cup defeat of Rangers at Ibrox the following season.

Partick Thistle
Lambie and Collins successful partnership saw Partick Thistle secure promotion to the Premier Division in 1992, the pair kept Thistle there over the next three seasons despite meagre financial resources.

Falkirk
In 1995 Lambie parted company with Thistle, looking for a fresh challenge, and took over at his old club Falkirk. Unfortunately, this proved to be a disastrous move for him. Poor results were compounded by the fans' unfavorable comparisons of Lambie's pragmatic tactical style with the entertaining football played under his predecessor, Jim Jefferies. Collins took over as caretaker manager briefly but did not manage a win in six matches.

Return to Thistle
In March 1999 Collins and Lambie teamed up again after receiving another offer from Partick Thistle, who had plummeted spectacularly since the duos departure. Having already been relegated twice, the club were in danger of going down again, to the Third Division, when Lambie and Collins arrived. In arguably his greatest managerial feat, Lambie kept Thistle up, then went on to guide them to the Scottish Premier League following successive promotions. This period also saw the club reach the Scottish Cup semi-finals. Having once again kept Thistle in the top flight, Lambie retired as manager in 2003, allowing Collins to take over as manager.

Jags manager
Collins took over at a time when Partick Thistle were hampered by severe financial restrictions. They were victims of their own success as the core of their successful team was transferred to rival Premier League clubs who could offer higher wages and longer contracts. Even Motherwell who were in administration were able to offer double wages for key players Stephen Craigan and Alex Burns. This left Collins going for broke, he signed young players from Chelsea reserves and brought in experienced player Andy Thomson who had been a prolific goalscorer in the lower leagues in England.

Thistle's new look side struggled to cope at this level and were bottom of the league with no wins when Collins was sacked as manager.

Glenafton
After leaving Partick Thistle, Collins took up the position as manager at junior side Glenafton Athletic in 2005. After initial success, winning the Ayrshire League Cup and the West of Scotland Cup, Collins resigned in 2007.

References

External links
 

 

1955 births
Living people
Scottish footballers
Scottish football managers
Partick Thistle F.C. managers
Falkirk F.C. managers
Hamilton Academical F.C. players
Partick Thistle F.C. players
Albion Rovers F.C. players
Ayr United F.C. players
Stranraer F.C. players
Association football defenders
Footballers from Glasgow
Scottish Football League players
Scottish Premier League managers
Glenafton Athletic F.C. managers
St Roch's F.C. players
Scottish Football League managers